Nu Puppis (ν Puppis) is a solitary, blue-hued star in the southern constellation of Puppis. It is the fifth-brightest star in Puppis, with an apparent visual magnitude of 3.17. Based upon an annual parallax shift of 8.78 mas as seen from Earth, it is located about 370 light years from the Sun. The system made its closest approach about 3.6 million years ago when it underwent perihelion passage at a distance of roughly 27 light years.

The star has a stellar classification of B8 III, matching a B-type giant. Absorption lines in the spectrum are displaying central quasi-emission peaks, indicating this is a Be shell star with a circumstellar disk of heated gas that is being seen edge-on. ν Puppis is a candidate variable star showing an amplitude of 0.0117 magnitude with a frequency of 0.15292 per day. It is spinning rapidly with a projected rotational velocity of 225 km/s. This rotation is giving the star an oblate shape, with the equator being 31% larger than the poles. It is radiating (after allowance for ultraviolet radiation) 1,340 times the Sun's luminosity from its photosphere at an effective temperature of 12,120 K.

References

B-type giants
Shell stars
Puppis, Nu
Puppis
Durchmusterung objects
047670
031685
2451